Ascandra corallicola is a species of calcareous sponge in the family Leucaltidae. It occurs solely on dead parts of the corals Lophelia pertusa and Solenosmilia variabilis, to which its specific name corallicola refers to.

References

corallicola
Fauna of the Atlantic Ocean
Animals described in 2006